Woodenbong is a rural village in the Kyogle Shire of northern New South Wales. It is situated 10 km south of the Queensland border and five kilometres south of the junction of the Summerland Way and the Mount Lindesay Road, which leads to Legume and eventually Tenterfield. At the  Woodenbong had a population of 390.

It is 798 km north-east of Sydney, 145 km from Brisbane and 60 km north-west of Kyogle.

Education
Woodenbong is home to Woodenbong Central School, a Kindergarten – Year 12 central school, that serves as the common education centre for Woodenbong, as well as surrounding towns, Urbenville and Muli Muli. Woodenbong Central School has played host on numerous occasions to sporting events held between other rural New South Wales towns.

Name
The name is derived from a Githabul word meaning wood ducks on a lagoon. The Githabal (also known as Gidabal, Kitabal) language region includes the landscape within the local government boundaries in Queensland of the Southern Downs Regional Council, particularly Warwick, Killarney, and Woodenbong extending into New South Wales.

Agriculture
Dairy farming and cattle grazing are the two main industries.

National Parks
A number of National Parks are close to Woodenbong, some of which are declared World Heritage areas.
 Border Ranges National Park
 Koreelah National Park
 Toonumbar National Park
 Mount Warning National Park
 Lamington National Park
 Mount Barney National Park
 Springbrook National Park

References

External links

Clean and Green: Woodenbong
 http://www.woodenbong.org
 Northern Rivers Geology Blog – Woodenbong

Towns in New South Wales
Northern Rivers
Kyogle Council